PT-7 or variant, may refer to:
 Sukhoi PT-7, a 1950s experimental Soviet fighter-aircraft, a modified Sukhoi T-3 prototype.
 Mohawk YPT-7 Pinto a single Mohawk M1C evaluated by the USAAC as a primary trainer.
 Pratt & Whitney Canada PT-7, a turboprop engine re-designated as the Pratt & Whitney Canada PW100.
 PT-7, a pre-World War II US Navy PT-boat.